Clobenzepam is an antihistamine and anticholinergic.

References 

Dibenzodiazepines
Lactams
Chloroarenes
H1 receptor antagonists